Jean François Leval (18 April 1762 – 7 August 1834) was promoted to general officer during the French Revolutionary Wars and led a division in a number of battles during the Napoleonic Wars. He rapidly rose in rank during the French Revolution. Appointed to command a demi-brigade beginning early in 1793, by the end of the year he was a general of brigade. He led a brigade at Fleurus in 1794 and in the campaign of 1795. In 1799 he became a general of division. He commanded a division in Napoleon Bonaparte's Grand Army at the battles of Jena and Eylau. Later he transferred to Spain where he fought in numerous actions including Talavera, Ocaña, Barossa, Vitoria, and the Nive. The only action in which he commanded an army was the Siege of Tarifa, which was a failure. In 1814, he led his division in eastern France. His surname is one of the names inscribed under the Arc de Triomphe, on Column 7.

References

French military personnel of the American Revolutionary War
French generals
French Republican military leaders of the French Revolutionary Wars
French commanders of the Napoleonic Wars
Military personnel from Paris
1762 births
1834 deaths
Names inscribed under the Arc de Triomphe